Narayanapuram (also spelled Narayana Puram) is a village and Gram panchayat of Yadadri district, in Telangana state.

References 

Villages in Yadadri Bhuvanagiri district